List of flight destinations served by Air Polonia. Between 2001 and 2004 the airline served 3 scheduled destinations in Africa and 25 in Europe. It also operated various cargo routes on behalf of TNT Airways. The destinations served were as follows (routes operated for TNT Airways are not included):

Air Polonia
Defunct airlines of Poland